Paula Deppe (12 October 1886, Rokycany – 4 October 1922, Passau) was a Bohemian-German painter, engraver and illustrator; known for landscapes, portraits and still-lifes.

Biography 
Her father was the manager of a leather factory. She began her artistic education at the Akademischer Malerschule in Pilsen, an art school exclusively for women, under the direction of the Czech painter, .

There, she studied with Heinrich Knirr and Ferdinand Götz (1874–1941). She also supplemented her formal lessons with classes at a private academy operated by Julius Seyler.

Her major showings include one in 1914, at the "International Exhibition of Book and Graphic Arts" (BUGRA) in Leipzig, and exhibitions of the Münchener Neue Secession in 1919 (at the Glaspalast) and 1921. The latter came about after her intimate friend, the landscape painter , introduced her to Maria Caspar-Filser and her husband, Karl Caspar, two of the Secession's founders.

For most of her life, she lived with her parents or siblings. After World War I, when her father's leather factory was given to the new government of Czechoslovakia, the family moved to Seestetten, near Passau, where he opened a sawmill. Shortly after, Paula moved into a house with her sister Frieda in nearby Laufenbach.

She died of blood poisoning at a clinic in Passau, following an operation to treat abdominal tuberculosis.

Sources 
 Max Brunner, Petra Gruber, Sandra Gabert (eds.): Paula Deppe – Lebensskizzen einer Künstlerin. (exhibition catalog) OberhausMuseum Passau, 2011  
 Herbert Schindler: Paula Deppe – Wege und Umwege zu einer Künstlerin. Einhell, 1982
 Paula Deppe 1886–1922 – Graphik und Arbeiten auf Papier. Landstritch, 1992 
 Aus den Tagebüchern der Paula Deppe. (personal diaries), Neuauflage, Hamburg-Harburg, 1942

External links 

1886 births
1922 deaths
20th-century German painters
20th-century German women artists
20th-century deaths from tuberculosis
German landscape painters
German portrait painters
Sudeten German people
People from Rokycany
Tuberculosis deaths in Germany
Infectious disease deaths in Germany
Deaths from sepsis
German women painters
Painters from the Austro-Hungarian Empire